Professor Dapo Akande  is a British-Nigerian academic and lawyer. Akande is a Professor of Public International Law at the University of Oxford's Blavatnik School of Government, a Fellow at Exeter College, Oxford and co-director of the Oxford Institute for Ethics, Law and Armed Conflict (ELAC). Akande was the first Black professor to be honoured with a portrait at St Peter's College, Oxford. Akande is a founding editor of EJIL:Talk!, the scholarly blog of the European Journal of International Law.
 
In November 2020, Akande was nominated as the United Kingdom candidate for the International Law Commission of the United Nations based in Geneva, Switzerland, for the term 2023–2027. In June 2021, it was announced that Akande had also been nominated by Japan, Kenya, Slovenia and Nigeria and was the first candidate to be nominated by countries from four United Nations regional groups in the history of the International Law Commission. On 12 November 2021, Akande was elected to the International Law Commission at the 76th session of the United Nations General Assembly in New York.

Education

Akande graduated with a Bachelor of Laws (LLB) from Obafemi Awolowo University (formerly the University of Ife) in 1992. In 1993, he qualified as a barrister and solicitor from the Nigerian Law School. Akande was awarded a Master of Laws (LLM) from the London School of Economics and Political Science in 1994, and was awarded a Master of Arts (MA) by resolution from the University of Oxford in 2004.

Academic career

Since 2004, Akande has lectured in Public International Law at the University of Oxford. Prior to that, Akande taught law at Durham University (2000–2004), University of Nottingham (1998–2000), University of Cambridge (1996–1998) and at the London School of Economics and Political Science (1994–1998). Akande has also held numerous international visiting professorships and lectureships. 
 
Akande sits on the board of several legal journals and scholarly organisations, including the American Journal of International Law, Israel Law Review, Nigerian Yearbook of International Law, Ethiopian Yearbook of International Law and the African Journal of International and Comparative Law.

International legal career

Akande has engaged in advisory work for numerous national governments and international organizations on matters of international law. He has advised and assisted counsel or provided expert opinions in cases before the International Criminal Court, International Court of Justice, the International Tribunal for the Law of the Sea, the European Court of Human Rights, the World Trade Organization, North American Free Trade Area Dispute Settlement Panels and international arbitral tribunals. He has acted as Consultant for the African Union the Commonwealth Secretariat, and the Association of South East Asian Nations (ASEAN). Akande has also provided training on international law to lawyers, diplomats, military officers and other government officials, including officials from the UK Foreign, Commonwealth and Development Office and Royal Navy, the Government of Denmark, the Government of Sudan, and leaders from the Asia-Pacific Region.

Domestic legal career

Akande is a Member of Essex Court Chambers, London. He has also acted as an advisor in cases before the UK national courts, including the UK Supreme Court and advised the UK Parliament's All Party Parliamentary Group on Drones.

Publications

Akande has written or co-authored more than sixty publications on a wide range of international legal topics. His books include:

References

External links
Website of the International Law Commission 2021 Election
UK Government webpage on the UK candidate for the International Law Commission 2021: Prof Dapo Akande

Professor Dapo Akande 

Living people
Alumni of the University of Oxford
Year of birth missing (living people)